Kieran O'Driscoll is a Gaelic footballer from Camp, County Kerry, Ireland. He played with Kerry during the 1990s and had much success at underage level. He was part of the Kerry minor team that won the 1994 All Ireland minor title. He then moved on the Under 21 team where he won back to back All Ireland titles in 1995 and 1996, he also won 3 Munster Championships in a row from 1995–97. Despite his key role in much of Kerrys success, as an amateur, he never played senior.

References

https://web.archive.org/web/20190328115822/http://munster.gaa.ie/history/u21f_teams/
https://web.archive.org/web/20170729092004/http://hoganstand.com/Kerry/Profile.aspx

Year of birth missing (living people)
Living people
Annascaul Gaelic footballers
Kerry inter-county Gaelic footballers